Anna Dąbrowska-Banaszek (born 14 April 1961 in Chełm) is a Polish doctor, and member of the IX Sejm. She is associated with Agreement, a social-conservative economic-liberal party.

References 

1961 births
People from Chełm
Living people
20th-century Polish physicians
Members of the Polish Sejm 2019–2023
21st-century Polish physicians